Gåte is a band from Trøndelag, Norway playing Norwegian folk music bred with metal and electronica. Their style has been referred to as progressive folk-rock. The band was put together by Sveinung Sundli (violin, keyboards) in 2000 and originally consisted of his little sister Gunnhild Sundli (vocals), Gjermund Landrø (bass, backing vocals), Martin Langlie (drums) and Magnus Robot Børmark (guitar, keyboards). Langlie was replaced by Kenneth Kapstad in 2004.

History 
The band released their first EP ("Gåte") in 2000, and rapidly gained popularity. A second EP, also self-titled, was released in 2002. Their first album, "Jygri", released the same year proved to be their commercial breakthrough both in Norway and abroad, particularly in Scandinavia and Germany. They also gained a lot of media attention, particularly the distinctive voice of Gunnhild Sundli caught the interest of music journalists, who immediately started to speculate on her departure in order to establish a solo career. After the release of another EP, "Statt Opp (Maggeduliadei)" in 2003 and their second album, "Iselilja" in 2004, the band did indeed announce that they were taking a break. In their press release, issued September 6, one of the reasons cited was that Gunnhild wanted to devote time to other pursuits. Nevertheless, their record company Warner Music Norway issued a live album ("Liva") in 2006 which had been recorded at the Rockefeller Music Hall the previous year, and with bonus material from their concert at the Roskilde festival in 2003. Gåte made a comeback in 2017 with the EP "Attersyn", followed by the album "Svevn" in 2018.

During the first part of their career they toured extensively and played almost every popular music festival in Norway, as well as the major international festival Roskilde festival in Denmark. The band reunited for one concert in 2009, but then decided to follow this up with a mini-tour of Norway consisting of five concerts in 2010. The fifth concert was held at the roof of the Oslo Opera House, and the band stated that this would be their final farewell. In 2018, they started touring Norway again.

Song origins 
Many of Gåte's songs are rearranged versions of traditional Norwegian folk tunes, such as "Sjå Attende" (the title translates to "Look Back"), and "Knut Liten og Sylvelin" ("Little-Knut and Sylvelin"). Another main source of Gåte songs are poems by the Norwegian poet Astrid Krog Halse with added music by Sveinung Sundli, such as "Følgje" ("Company") and "Stengd Dør" ("Closed Door"). Some of their songs were written in Nynorsk/Landsmål and performed in a broad Trøndersk dialect.

On "Svevn", several songs have lyrics by veteran folk musician Knut Buen[2], who also wrote the lyrics to "Kjærleik" on "Iselilja".

Members

Gunnhild Sundli 

Gunnhild born 1985, is the band's lead vocalist and joined the band in 1999. She was born and grew up in Orkdal, and currently resides in Trondheim. She began to sing when she was 9 years old, and has since been singing in both classical and jazz music. She studied singing at Heimdal high school ("Heimdal videregående skole").

Sveinung Sundli 
Sveinung was born 1979, and is Gunnhild's older brother. He began learning to play the fiddle at an early age, and studied music in high school. Sveinung first persuaded Gunnhild to start singing in front of an audience, and he was the one who put Gåte together. He was taught to play keyboards/synth by Thomas Henriksen. In Gåte he plays keyboards/synths, the acoustic fiddle and electric Zeta-fiddle. He has written some of the melodies in Gåte: a "pols" called "Storås" and "Ola I", and he has set to music some of Astrid Krog Halse's poems: "Fredlysning", "Du som er ung" and "Sjåaren".
He recently formed a band which has "Råte" (meaning "rot") as its working title. In 2003, he got the idea for a big music festival in Norway, which became a reality in 2004 as Storåsfestivalen.

Gjermund Landrø 
Gjermund was born 1980. His main role in Gåte’s music is as bassist, but he has also contributed backing vocals.

Magnus Børmark 
Magnus was born 1982. From Trondheim. Learned to play guitar and piano from his older brother. He has played in popular rock bands, such as Torch, before joining Gåte in December 2000. He plays a Fender Telecaster, Robotcaster and Les Robot, the last two being made by Frank Stavem. He now plays guitar in the band 22.

Discography

Albums

Extended plays

Singles

References

External links 

 
 Gåte on Europopmusic.eu

1999 establishments in Norway
2005 disestablishments in Norway
2010 disestablishments in Norway
Musical groups disestablished in 2005
Musical groups disestablished in 2010
Musical groups established in 1999
Musical groups reestablished in 2009
Musical groups reestablished in 2017
Norwegian folk rock groups
Norwegian rock music groups
Norwegian progressive rock groups
Norwegian folk metal musical groups
Musical groups from Trøndelag
Spellemannprisen winners
Warner Music Group artists